According to the Book of Mormon, Gidgiddoni  was a prophet and the commander of the Nephite armies in the war between the Nephites and the Gadianton robbers. He was appointed in about AD 16 by Lachoneus to lead the armies because he had the spirit of revelation and of prophecy. During periods of Nephite righteousness, selection of military leaders possessed of these spiritual gifts was standard practice. Gidgiddoni demonstrated his wisdom by refusing the people's desire to wage offensive war against the robbers.

Gidgiddoni at their head, the Nephites were able to defeat the robbers and end the life of Giddianhi in AD 19.  The robbers tried again in AD 21, with a man named Zemnarihah leading them, but Gidgiddoni knew of the robbers' weaknesses and exploited them, making it impossible for them to retreat, and the Nephites took as many prisoners as would surrender, while putting the rest to death.  Zemnarihah, however, was hanged.

Finally, after the destruction of the band of robbers, Lachoneus and Gidgiddoni brought peace to the Nephites. Gidgiddoni is not mentioned further in the scripture after this.

In the account of the prophet-general Gidgiddoni, the Book of Mormon offers meaningful guidance about the possible justifications for waging war. Prohibiting preemptive strikes, even against a seemingly intractable foe, God tells Gidgiddoni to prepare the Nephite people, gather their armies, and wait, instead of hunting the enemy to "destroy them in their own lands." This restraint was typical of other Nephite military chiefs who, like Gidgiddoni, were also prophets.

References

Book of Mormon prophets